Gorokhovsky is a rural locality (a village) in Permasskoye Rural Settlement, Nikolsky District, Vologda Oblast, Russia. The population was 9 as of 2002.

Geography 
The distance to Nikolsk is 55 km, to Permas is 27 km. Kudanga is the nearest rural locality.

References 

Rural localities in Nikolsky District, Vologda Oblast